15 Year Killing Spree is a box set by the American death metal band Cannibal Corpse. The cover art contains demons and skeletons placed in windows in a castle surrounded by a moat of blood.  Observant Cannibal Corpse fans will notice that the cover art, drawn by the usual artist Vincent Locke draws from the themes and features characters from previous Cannibal Corpse albums.

In addition to the three CDs and DVD which are listed below, this boxed set also contains a poster of the band.  Two thousand of the posters that were shipped with the boxed set were autographed by the band.  The boxed set also contains a booklet with history and commentary by the band members as well as pictures from the band's history.

15 Year Killing Spree also contains a comic book depicting the story behind one of Cannibal Corpse's most famous songs "Unleashing The Bloodthirsty" from their album Bloodthirst.

Track listing

Disc four

First live Cannibal Corpse show 1989
 "Scattered Remains, Splattered Brains"
 "The Undead Will Feast"
 "Escape the Torment" (Was never recorded)
 "Bloody Chunks"
 "Enter at Your Own Risk" (Was never recorded)
 "Put Them to Death"
 "A Skull Full of Maggots"

"Butchered at Birth" studio footage 1991
 "Drum sessions for the track 'Covered With Sores' and bass guitar overdub for the track 'Innards Decay'"

"Cannibal Corpse Eats Moscow Alive" 1993
 "Shredded Humans"
 "The Cryptic Stench"
 "Meathook Sodomy"
 "Edible Autopsy"
 "I Cum Blood"
 "Gutted"
 "Entrails Ripped from a Virgin's Cunt"
 "Beyond the Cemetery"
 "A Skull Full of Maggots"

Live at Avalon Hollywood, Hollywood, CA 04.12.2002 (Metal Blade 20th Anniversary Party)
 "From Skin to Liquid"
 "Savage Butchery"
 "Devoured by Vermin"
 "Stripped, Raped and Strangled"
 "Disposal of the Body"
 "Pounded Into Dust"
 "Addicted to Vaginal Skin"
 "Meat Hook Sodomy"
 "Pit of Zombies"
 "Hammer Smashed Face"

References

Cannibal Corpse compilation albums
2003 compilation albums
2003 live albums
2003 video albums
Live video albums
Metal Blade Records video albums
Metal Blade Records compilation albums
Metal Blade Records live albums
Cannibal Corpse video albums
Cannibal Corpse live albums